Constitutionalism is "a compound of ideas, attitudes, and patterns of behavior elaborating      the principle that the authority of government derives from and is limited by a body of fundamental law".

Political organizations are constitutional to the extent that they "contain institutionalized mechanisms of power control for the protection of the interests and liberties of the citizenry, including those that may be in the minority". As described by political scientist and constitutional scholar David Fellman:

Definition 
Constitutionalism has prescriptive and descriptive uses. Law professor Gerhard Casper captured this aspect of the term in noting, "Constitutionalism has both descriptive and prescriptive connotations.  Used descriptively, it refers chiefly to the historical struggle for constitutional recognition of the people's right to 'consent' and certain other rights, freedoms, and privileges. Used prescriptively, its meaning incorporates those features of government seen as the essential elements of the... Constitution".

Descriptive
One example of constitutionalism's descriptive use is law professor Bernard Schwartz's five volume compilation of sources seeking to trace the origins of the U.S. Bill of Rights. Beginning with English antecedents going back to Magna Carta (1215), Schwartz explores the presence and development of ideas of individual freedoms and privileges through colonial charters and legal understandings. Then in carrying the story forward, he identifies revolutionary declarations and constitutions, documents and judicial decisions of the Confederation period and the formation of the federal Constitution. Finally, he turns to the debates over the federal Constitution's ratification that ultimately provided mounting pressure for a federal bill of rights. While hardly presenting a straight line, the account illustrates the historical struggle to recognize and enshrine constitutional rights and principles in a constitutional order.

Prescriptive
In contrast to describing what constitutions are, a prescriptive approach addresses what a constitution should be. As presented by the Canadian philosopher Wil Waluchow, constitutionalism embodies

One example of this prescriptive approach was the project of the National Municipal League to develop a model state constitution.

Constitutionalism vs. Constitution 
The study of constitutions is not necessarily synonymous with the study of constitutionalism.  Although frequently conflated, there are crucial differences. A discussion of this difference appears in legal historian Christian G. Fritz's American Sovereigns: The People and America's Constitutional Tradition Before the Civil War, a study of the early history of American constitutionalism. Fritz notes that an analyst could approach the study of historic events focusing on issues that entailed "constitutional questions" and that this differs from a focus that involves "questions of constitutionalism." Constitutional questions involve the analyst in examining how the constitution was interpreted and applied to distribute power and authority as the new nation struggled with problems of war and peace, taxation and representation. However,

A similar distinction was drawn by British constitutional scholar A.V. Dicey in assessing Britain's unwritten constitution. Dicey noted a difference between the "conventions of the constitution" and the "law of the constitution". The "essential distinction" between the two concepts was that the law of the constitution was made up of "rules enforced or recognised by the Courts", making up "a body of 'laws' in the proper sense of that term." In contrast, the conventions of the constitution consisted "of customs, practices, maxims, or precepts which are not enforced or recognised by the Courts" but "make up a body not of laws, but of constitutional or political ethics".

Core features

Fundamental law and legitimacy of government 
One of the most salient features of constitutionalism is that it describes and prescribes both the source and the limits of government power derived from fundamental law. William H. Hamilton has captured this dual aspect by noting that constitutionalism "is the name given to the trust which men repose in the power of words engrossed on parchment to keep a government in order."

Moreover, whether reflecting a descriptive or prescriptive focus, treatments of the concept of constitutionalism all deal with the legitimacy of government. One recent assessment of American constitutionalism, for example, notes that the idea of constitutionalism serves to define what it is that "grants and guides the legitimate exercise of government authority". Similarly, historian Gordon S. Wood described this American constitutionalism as "advanced thinking" on the nature of constitutions in which the constitution was conceived to be a "sett of fundamental rules by which even the supreme power of the state shall be governed." Ultimately, American constitutionalism came to rest on the collective sovereignty of the people, the source that legitimized American governments.

Civil rights and liberties 
Constitutionalism is not simply about the power structure of society. It also asks for a strong protection of the interests of citizens, civil rights as well as civil liberties, especially for the social minorities, and has a close relation with democracy. The United Kingdom has had basic laws limiting governmental power for centuries. Historically, there has been little political support for introducing a comprehensive written or codified constitution in the UK. However, several commentators and reformers have argued for a new British Bill of Rights to provide liberty, democracy and the rule of law with more effective constitutional protection.

Criticisms 
Legal scholar Jeremy Waldron contends that constitutionalism is often undemocratic:

Constitutionalism has also been the subject of criticism by Murray Rothbard, who attacked constitutionalism as being incapable of restraining governments and not protecting the rights of citizens from their governments:
[i]t is true that, in the United States, at least, we have a constitution that imposes strict limits on some powers of government. But, as we have discovered in the past century, no constitution can interpret or enforce itself; it must be interpreted by men. And if the ultimate power to interpret a constitution is given to the government's own Supreme Court, then the inevitable tendency is for the Court to continue to place its imprimatur on ever-broader powers for its own government. Furthermore, the highly touted "checks and balances" and "separation of powers" in the American government are flimsy indeed, since in the final analysis all of these divisions are part of the same government and are governed by the same set of rulers.

Constitutionalism by nations 
Used descriptively, the concept of constitutionalism can refer chiefly to the historical struggle for constitutional recognition of the people's right to "consent" and certain other rights, freedoms, and privileges. On the other hand, the prescriptive approach to constitutionalism addresses what a constitution should be. Two observations might be offered about its prescriptive use.
 There is often confusion in equating the presence of a written constitution with the conclusion that a state or polity is one based upon constitutionalism. As noted by David Fellman, constitutionalism "should not be taken to mean that if a state has a constitution, it is necessarily committed to the idea of constitutionalism. In a very real sense... every state may be said to have a constitution, since every state has institutions which are at the very least expected to be permanent, and every state has established ways of doing things". But even with a "formal written document labelled 'constitution' which includes the provisions customarily found in such a document, it does not follow that it is committed to constitutionalism...."
 Often the word "constitutionalism" is used in a  rhetorical sense, as a political argument that equates the views of the speaker or writer with a preferred view of the constitution. For instance, University of Maryland Constitutional History Professor Herman Belz's critical assessment of expansive constitutional construction notes that "constitutionalism... ought to be recognized as a distinctive ideology and approach to political life.... Constitutionalism not only establishes the institutional and intellectual framework, but it also supplies much of the rhetorical currency with which political transactions are carried on." Similarly, Georgetown University Law Center Professor Louis Michael Seidman noted as well the confluence of political rhetoric with arguments supposedly rooted in constitutionalism. In assessing the "meaning that critical scholars attributed to constitutional law in the late twentieth century," Professor Seidman notes a "new order... characterized most prominently by extremely aggressive use of legal argument and rhetoric" and as a result "powerful legal actors are willing to advance arguments previously thought out-of-bounds.  They have, in short, used legal reasoning to do exactly what crits claim legal reasoning always does—put the lipstick of disinterested constitutionalism on the pig of raw politics."

United States

Descriptive 
Constitutionalism of the United States has been defined as a complex of ideas, attitudes and patterns elaborating the principle that the authority of government derives from the people, and is limited by a body of fundamental law. These ideas, attitudes and patterns, according to one analyst, derive from "a dynamic political and historical process rather than from a static body of thought laid down in the eighteenth century".

In U.S. history, constitutionalism, in both its descriptive and prescriptive sense, has traditionally focused on the federal constitution. Indeed, a routine assumption of many scholars has been that understanding "American constitutionalism" necessarily entails the thought that went into the drafting of the federal constitution and the American experience with that constitution since its ratification in 1789.

There is a rich tradition of state constitutionalism that offers broader insight into constitutionalism in the United States. While state constitutions and the federal constitution operate differently as a function of federalism from the coexistence and interplay of governments at both a national and state level, they all rest on a shared assumption that their legitimacy comes from the sovereign authority of the people or popular sovereignty. This underlying premise, embraced by the American revolutionaries with the Declaration of Independence unites American constitutional tradition.

Both experience with state constitutions before and after the federal constitution as well as the emergence and operation of the latter reflect an ongoing struggle over the idea that all governments in America rested on the sovereignty of the people for their legitimacy.

Prescriptive 
Starting with the proposition that "'Constitutionalism' refers to the position or practice that government be limited by a constitution, usually written," analysts take a variety of positions on what the constitution means. For instance, they describe the document as a document that may specify its relation to statutes, treaties, executive and judicial actions, and the constitutions or laws of regional jurisdictions. This prescriptive use of Constitutionalism is also concerned with the principles of constitutional design, which includes the principle that the field of public action be partitioned between delegated powers to the government and the rights of individuals, each of which is a restriction of the other, and that no powers be delegated that are beyond the competence of government.

Two notable Chief Justices of the United States who played an important role in the development of American constitutionalism are John Marshall and Earl Warren. John Marshall, the 4th Chief Justice, upheld the principle of judicial review in the 1803 landmark case Marbury v. Madison, whereby Supreme Court could strike down federal and state laws if they conflicted with the Constitution. By establishing the principle of judicial review, Marshall Court helped implement the ideology of separation of powers and cement the position of the American judiciary as an independent and co-equal branch of government. On the other hand, Earl Warren, the 14th Chief Justice, greatly extended civil rights and civil liberties of all Americans through a series of landmark rulings. The Warren Court started a liberal Constitutional Revolution by bringing "one man, one vote" to the United States, tearing apart racial segregation and state laws banning interracial marriage, extending the coverage of Bill of Rights, providing defendants' rights to an attorney and to silence (Miranda warning), and so on.

United Kingdom

Descriptive 

The United Kingdom is perhaps the best instance of constitutionalism in a country that has an uncodified constitution. A variety of developments in 17th century England, including the Constitutional Monarchy and "the protracted struggle for power between King and Parliament was accompanied by an efflorescence of political ideas in which the concept of countervailing powers was clearly defined,"
led to a well-developed polity with multiple governmental and private institutions that counter the power of the state.

Prescriptive 
Constitutionalist was also a label used by some independent candidates in UK general elections in the early 1920s. Most of the candidates were former Liberal Party members, and many of them joined the Conservative Party soon after being elected. The best known Constitutionalist candidate was Winston Churchill in the 1924 UK general election.

Japan
On May 3, 1947, the sovereign state of Japan has maintained a unitary parliamentary constitutional monarchy with an Emperor and an elected legislature called the National Diet.

Polish–Lithuanian Commonwealth

Descriptive 
From the mid-sixteenth to the late eighteenth century, the Polish–Lithuanian Commonwealth utilized the liberum veto, a form of unanimity voting rule, in its parliamentary deliberations. The "principle of liberum veto played an important role in [the] emergence of the unique Polish form of constitutionalism." This constraint on the powers of the monarch were significant in making the "[r]ule of law, religious tolerance and limited constitutional government... the norm in Poland in times when the rest of Europe was being devastated by religious hatred and despotism."

Prescriptive
The Constitution of May 3, 1791, which historian Norman Davies calls "the first constitution of its kind in Europe", was in effect for only a year. It was designed to redress longstanding political defects of the Polish–Lithuanian Commonwealth and its traditional system of "Golden Liberty". The Constitution introduced political equality between townspeople and nobility (szlachta) and placed the peasants under the protection of the government, thus mitigating the worst abuses of serfdom.

Dominican Republic
After the democratically elected government of president Juan Bosch in the Dominican Republic was deposed, the Constitutionalist movement was born in the country. As opposed to said movement, the Anti-constitutionalist movement was also born. Bosch had to depart to Puerto Rico after he was deposed. His first leader was Colonel Rafael Tomás Fernández Domínguez, and he wanted Bosch to come back to power once again. Colonel Fernández Domínguez was exiled to Puerto Rico where Bosch was. The Constitutionalists had a new leader: Colonel Francisco Alberto Caamaño Deñó.

Islamic states 
The scope and limits of constitutionalism in Muslim countries have attracted growing interest in recent years. Authors such as Ann E. Mayer define Islamic constitutionalism as "constitutionalism that is in some form based on Islamic principles, as opposed to constitutionalism that has developed in countries that happen to be Muslim but that has not been informed by distinctively Islamic principles". However, the concrete meaning of the notion remains contested among Muslim as well as Western scholars. Influential thinkers like Mohammad Hashim Kamali and Khaled Abou El Fadl, but also younger ones like Asifa Quraishi and Nadirsyah Hosen combine classic Islamic law with modern constitutionalism. The constitutional changes initiated by the Arab Spring movement have already brought into reality many new hybrid models of Islamic constitutionalism.

See also 
 Classical liberalism
 Constitutional liberalism
 Constitution Party (disambiguation)
 Constitutional law
 Constitutionalism in the United States
 Digital constitutionalism
 Judicial interpretation
 Libertarianism
 Natural and legal rights
 Philosophy of law
 Rule according to higher law
 Rule of law
 Separation of powers
 Social contract

References

Further reading
 Gebeye, Berihun Adugna (2021). A Theory of African Constitutionalism. Oxford University Press.
 Möller, Kai (2012). The Global Model of Constitutional Rights,  Oxford University Press.

External links 
 
 Philip P. Wiener, ed., "Dictionary of the History of Ideas: Studies of Selected Pivotal Ideas", (David Fellman, "Constitutionalism"), vol 1, pp. 485, 491–492 (1973–74).
 National Humanities Institute
 MJC Vile Constitutionalism and the Separation of Powers (1967, Indianapolis: Liberty Fund, 1998) Second edition.
 "Economics and the Rule of Law" The Economist (2008-03-13).
 Middle East Constitutional Forum
 The Social and Political Foundations of Constitutions Foundation for Law, Justice and Society programme

Comparative politics
Constitutional law
Philosophy of law
Theories of law
Western culture